The Veer Dam is one of the important dams in Maharashtra, India. It is a rubble-concrete dam constructed on Nira River. It is located in near Shirwal, Satara district. The water is mainly used for irrigation and farming. The dam is located around 70 km from Pune. This place offers a good stretch of 7–8 km along the river Nira. This entire belt along the river is extremely rich with Avifauna.

Details
The main purpose of the dam is hydroelectricity with some irrigation in neighboring areas. It is at the border of Pune district and Satara district. Veer Dam has now become a key bird-watching spot around Pune. This includes the Bar-headed Geese & Demoiselle Cranes. There are over 170 different species of birds at Veer Dam. Also there are waders, raptors as well as flycatchers in and around Veer Dam.

See also

 Dams in Maharashtra
 List of power stations in India
 List of conventional hydroelectric power stations

References

External links 
 

Dams in Satara district
Gravity dams
Dams in Western Ghats
Dams completed in 1965
1965 establishments in Maharashtra
20th-century architecture in India